Blame It On the Streets is the name to both a short film and its soundtrack album by American hip hop recording artist YG. It was released on December 15, 2014, by Def Jam Recordings, his Pu$haz Ink label, along with Jeezy CTE World label. The album features guest appearances from Big Wy, Jay 305, RJ, Nipsey Hussle, The Neighbourhood, TeeCee4800, Charley Hood, Slim 400, D-Lo, Mack 10 and DJ Quik. The film was attached to digital copies for the soundtrack, and is now available for streaming on Netflix.

Background
The film highlights YG's life on the streets of Compton before his rise to fame. Co-written by YG with the help of Darryl "Lucky" Rodgers, Blame It On the Streets draws inspiration from two of the rapper's album cuts: "BPT", a song about YG's initiation into the infamous Piru Bloods gang, and "Meet the Flockers", which describes his experience as a house burglar; YG said, "It's a group of your homies, so it's a flock of y'all going out lurking, looking for some s--t to rob," he explains. "That's why we call it flocking. I'm basically showing you the life behind those songs."

Commercial performance

The album debuted at number 118 on the US Billboard 200 chart, selling 17,000 copies in the first week. The album has sold 90,000 copies in the United States as of June 2016.

Track listing

Executive Producer: YG, Sickamore, DJ Mustard
Co- Executive Producer: Jeezy

CTE Music President: Steven "Steve-O" Carless

Charts

References

2014 albums
Def Jam Recordings albums
Albums produced by DJ Mustard
Albums produced by Mike Free
Albums produced by Terrace Martin
YG (rapper) albums